Jönsson is a Nordic, mostly Swedish surname. Notable people with the surname include:

Alexander Achinioti-Jönsson (born 1996), Swedish footballer
Anita Jönsson (born 1947), Swedish politician
Bengt Jönsson (athletics coach) (born 1958), Swedish athletic trainer
Christine Jönsson (born 1958), Swedish politician
Egon Jönsson (1921–2000), Swedish footballer
Emil Jönsson (born 1985), Swedish cross country skier
Jan Jönsson (born 1960), Swedish footballer and coach
Jon Jönsson (born 1983), Swedish footballer
Jörgen Jönsson (born 1972), Swedish ice hockey player
Kenny Jönsson (born 1974), Swedish ice hockey player
Lars Jönsson (film producer), Swedish film producer
Mona Jönsson (born 1951), Swedish politician
Niclas Jönsson (born 1967), Swedish race car driver
Olle Jönsson (born 1955), Swedish singer
Pär-Gunnar Jönsson, Swedish badminton player
Tommy Jönsson (born 1976), Swedish footballer

See also
Jonsson
Jónsson

Swedish-language surnames
Patronymic surnames
Surnames from given names